Champions Bowl II was the second title game of Champions Indoor Football (CIF). It was played on June 27, 2016.

Road to the Champions Bowl
The three teams (ordered by seeding) that made the postseason in the Northern Division were the Wichita Force, Bloomington Edge, and Sioux City Bandits. In the Southern Division, the playoff teams were the Texas Revolution, Amarillo Venom, and Dodge City Law. On Saturday, June 11, Bloomington (at home) defeated Sioux City, 65–45. That same night, Amarillo defeated visiting Dodge City, 98–56. This matched Amarillo against Texas and Bloomington against Wichita in their division championships. Wichita won 52–51 and Amarillo won 57–53, setting up a matchup for Monday, June 27 for the second Champions Bowl.

Playoffs

2016 Champions Indoor Football season
Champions Bowl
Wichita Force
Amarillo Venom
2016 in sports in Kansas
Sports competitions in Kansas
June 2016 sports events in the United States